Lyubov Vladimirovna Kozyreva, Lyubov Baranova from 1960 onwards (27 August 1929 – 22 June 2015), was a Soviet cross-country skier who competed in the 1950s and 1960s with VSS Burevestnik. She was born in the settlement of Bugry, Vsevolozhsky District, Leningrad Oblast and died in Moscow.

She won four Winter Olympic medals with a gold in the 10 km (1956) and silvers in the 10 km (1960) and the 3 × 5 km relay (1956, 1960). She also won the 10 km event at the Holmenkollen ski festival in 1955, becoming the first Soviet athlete to win at the Holmenkollen. Her biggest successes were at the FIS Nordic World Ski Championships where she won six medals, including four golds (10 km: 1954, 3 × 5 km relay: 1954, 1958, 1962) and two silvers (10 km: 1958, 5 km: 1962).

Cross-country skiing results
All results are sourced from the International Ski Federation (FIS).

Olympic Games
 4 medals – (1 gold, 3 silver)

World Championships
 6 medals – (4 gold, 2 silver)

References

External links

 - click Vinnere for downloadable pdf file 
Lyubov Kozyreva's obituary 

1929 births
2015 deaths
Burevestnik (sports society) athletes
Cross-country skiers at the 1956 Winter Olympics
Cross-country skiers at the 1960 Winter Olympics
Holmenkollen Ski Festival winners
Olympic cross-country skiers of the Soviet Union
Olympic gold medalists for the Soviet Union
Olympic silver medalists for the Soviet Union
Russian female cross-country skiers
Soviet female cross-country skiers
Olympic medalists in cross-country skiing
FIS Nordic World Ski Championships medalists in cross-country skiing
Medalists at the 1956 Winter Olympics
Medalists at the 1960 Winter Olympics
People from Vsevolozhsky District
Sportspeople from Leningrad Oblast